Paracoryne is a monotypic genus of cnidarians belonging to the monotypic family Paracorynidae. 

The only species is Paracoryne huvei.

The species is found in Southern Europe.

References

 Picard, J. (1957). Étude sur les hydroïdes de la superfamille Pteronematoidea, 1. Généralités. Bulletin de l'institut Océanographique. 1106 : 1-12
 van der Land, J.; Vervoort, W.; Cairns, S.D.; Schuchert, P. (2001). Hydrozoa, in: Costello, M.J. et al. (Ed.) (2001). European register of marine species: a check-list of the marine species in Europe and a bibliography of guides to their identification. Collection Patrimoines Naturels, 50: pp. 112-120

External links
 Neave, Sheffield Airey. (1939-1996). Nomenclator Zoologicus vol. 1-10 Online

Monotypic cnidarian genera
Aplanulata
Hydrozoan genera